The 1983–84 QMJHL season was the 15th season in the history of the Quebec Major Junior Hockey League. Eleven teams played 70 games each in the regular season.

Mario Lemieux of the Laval Voisins scored 133 goals, and had 149 assists, setting the all-time Canadian Hockey League record of 282 points, and 133 goals in a regular season. His total of 149 assists ranks second to Pierre Larouche's total of 157 from the 1973–74 QMJHL season. Lemieux also won four QMHL trophies at the season's end, as well as the CHL Player of the Year award.

The Laval Voisins repeated as first overall in the regular season, winning the Jean Rougeau Trophy, and won their first President's Cup, defeating the Longueuil Chevaliers in the finals.

Final standings
Note: GP = Games played; W = Wins; L = Losses; T = Ties; Pts = Points; GF = Goals for; GA = Goals against

complete list of standings.

Scoring leaders
Note: GP = Games played; G = Goals; A = Assists; Pts = Points; PIM = Penalties in Minutes

 complete scoring statistics

Playoffs
Mario Lemieux was the leading scorer of the playoffs with 52 points (29 goals, 23 assists).

Quarterfinals
 Laval Voisins defeated Granby Bisons 4 games to 0.
 Verdun Juniors defeated Saint-Jean Castors 4 games to 0.
 Drummondville Voltigeurs defeated Shawinigan Cataractes 4 games to 2.
 Longueuil Chevaliers defeated Quebec Remparts 4 games to 1.

Semifinals
 Laval Voisins defeated Drummondville Voltigeurs 4 games to 0.
 Longueuil Chevaliers defeated Verdun Juniors 4 games to 2.

Finals
 Laval Voisins defeated Longueuil Chevaliers 4 games to 2.

All-star teams
First team
 Goaltender - Alain Raymond, Trois-Rivières Draveurs 
 Left defence - Steven Finn, Laval Voisins 
 Right defence - Billy Campbell, Verdun Juniors
 Left winger - Claude Gosselin, Quebec Remparts 
 Centreman - Mario Lemieux, Laval Voisins
 Right winger - Jacques Goyette, Laval Voisins  
 Coach - Pierre Creamer, Verdun Juniors
Second team
 Goaltender - Luc Guenette, Quebec Remparts  
 Left defence - Jerome Carrier, Verdun Juniors
 Right defence - Sylvain Cote, Quebec Remparts 
 Left winger - Yves Courteau, Laval Voisins
 Centreman - Claude Lebebvre, Quebec Remparts
 Right winger - Claude Lemieux, Verdun Juniors
 Coach - Jean Bégin, Laval Voisins

List of First/Second/Rookie team all-stars

Trophies and awards
Team
President's Cup - Playoff Champions, Laval Voisins
Jean Rougeau Trophy - Regular Season Champions, Laval Voisins
Robert Lebel Trophy - Team with best GAA, Shawinigan Cataractes

Player
Michel Brière Memorial Trophy - Most Valuable Player, Mario Lemieux, Laval Voisins
Jean Béliveau Trophy - Top Scorer, Mario Lemieux, Laval Voisins
Guy Lafleur Trophy - Playoff MVP, Mario Lemieux, Laval Voisins
Jacques Plante Memorial Trophy - Best GAA, Tony Haladuick, Laval Voisins
Emile Bouchard Trophy - Defenceman of the Year, Billy Campbell, Verdun Juniors
Mike Bossy Trophy - Best Pro Prospect, Mario Lemieux, Laval Voisins
Michel Bergeron Trophy - Offensive Rookie of the Year, Stephane Richer, Granby Bisons
Raymond Lagacé Trophy - Defensive Rookie of the Year, James Gasseau, Drummondville Voltigeurs 
Frank J. Selke Memorial Trophy - Most sportsmanlike player, Jerome Carrier, Verdun Juniors
Marcel Robert Trophy - Best Scholastic Player, Gilbert Paiement, Chicoutimi Saguenéens

See also
1984 Memorial Cup
1984 NHL Entry Draft
1983–84 OHL season
1983–84 WHL season

References
 Official QMJHL Website
 www.hockeydb.com/

Quebec Major Junior Hockey League seasons
QMJHL